Monumento a la Raza may refer to: 

 Monumento a la Raza (Medellín), a 1988 concrete monument in Medellín, Colombia
 Monumento a la Raza (Mexico City), a 1940 concrete monument in Cuauhtémoc, Mexico City
 Monumento a la Raza (Seville), a 1929 marble monument in Seville, Spain
 Monumento a la Raza, a monument in Zona Río, Tijuana, Mexico
 Monumento a la Raza Indígena, a monument in Tunja, Colombia